Jamie Moss is an American screenwriter.

Filmography
Street Kings (2008)
X-Men: First Class (2011, uncredited)
Rise of the Planet of the Apes (2011, uncredited)
Spectral (2016)
Ghost in the Shell (2017)
Hunter Killer (2018)

References

External links
 

American screenwriters
Living people
Year of birth missing (living people)